Now! was a short-lived liberal political party in Poland. The party was founded on 17 November 2018 by the former World Bank economist Ryszard Petru and Joanna Scheuring-Wielgus as a split from the Modern party which Petru was also a founder. His partner Joanna Schmidt, the vice-president of ALDE also defected. The party joined the European Coalition on 18 February 2019. The party was dissolved on 4 July 2019.

References

2018 establishments in Poland
Centrist parties in Poland
Defunct political parties in Poland
Liberal parties in Poland
Political parties established in 2018
Pro-European political parties in Poland